Wired for Sound is the 24th studio album by Cliff Richard, released in September 1981. The album peaked at number 4 in the UK album charts upon release, and spent a total of 25 weeks on the chart in 1981–82. The album was certified Platinum by the BPI, and achieved global sales of over one million.

The title track was released as the lead single of the album, and was followed up by a cover of Shep and the Limelites 1961 US doo-wop hit, "Daddy's Home". The singles peaked at numbers 4 and 2 respectively on the UK singles chart. "Daddy's Home" was held off number 1 for four consecutive weeks by the Human League's "Don't You Want Me", but earned gold certification from the BPI for sales over half a million. The track was recorded live at the Hammersmith Odeon on 1 May 1981, for a rock 'n' roll special to be broadcast later by BBC Television.

"Broken Doll" is a cover of a Wreckless Eric single from 1980. Reportedly, Richard also wanted to record Eric's "(I'd Go The) Whole Wide World" too, but only if he could change some of the lyrics – which Eric refused. "Young Love" was given new lyrics and retitled "The Last Kiss" for a cover version by David Cassidy featuring George Michael. It was released as the lead single for Cassidy's 1985 album Romance, becoming a top ten hit in the UK and Germany. "Once in a While" was originally recorded by Leo Sayer on his 1980 album Living in a Fantasy and released as a single in the UK and Australia.

The promotional video for the title track is one of Richard's best-known, and was filmed around the centre of Milton Keynes, the new town in Buckinghamshire that was developed after the Second World War. It features Richard walking around and on rollerskates, while listening to music on a Walkman cassette player; such devices were then newly available in the UK.

A remastered version of the album was issued in July 2001, with the B-sides of both singles included as bonus tracks.

Track listing 
All songs written and composed by Alan Tarney except where indicated.

Side one
 "Wired for Sound" (Tarney, B. A. Robertson) – 3:36
 "Once in a While" – 4:38
 "Better Than I Know Myself" (Dave Cooke, Judy MacKenzie) – 3:39
 "Oh No, Don't Let Go" – 3:37
 "'Cos I Love That Rock 'n' Roll" – 4:10

Side two
<li>"Broken Doll" (Eric Goulden, Walter Hacon) – 4:15
<li>"Lost in a Lonely World" (Chris Eaton) – 4:01
<li>"Summer Rain" (Eaton) – 4:15
<li>"Young Love" – 4:03
<li>"Say You Don't Mind" (does not appear on the US release) – 4:01
<li>"Daddy's Home" (live) (James Sheppard, William Miller) – 2:56

2001 reissue bonus tracks
<li>"Shakin' All Over" (live) (Frederick Heath) (B-side of "Daddy's Home") – 2:43
<li>"Hold On" (B-side of "Wired for Sound") – 3:43

Personnel
Cliff Richard – vocals and backing vocals
John Clark – guitar on "Lost in a Lonely World"
Nick Glennie-Smith – piano on "Young Love", engineer
Graham Jarvis – drums on all tracks except "Once in a While", "Summer Rain" and "Young Love"
Trevor Spencer – drums on "Once in a While", "Summer Rain" and "Young Love"
Alan Tarney – all instruments except those listed in credits, backing vocals, arrangements, production
Rebecca Swearingen - photography

Charts and certifications

Charts

Year-end charts

Certifications

References 

1981 albums
Cliff Richard albums
EMI Records albums
Albums produced by Alan Tarney